Sledge Hammer! is a satirical American television series broadcast on ABC in the United States. The series was created by Alan Spencer and stars David Rasche as Inspector Sledge Hammer, a preposterous caricature of the standard "cop on the edge" character. It was first broadcast on September 23, 1986 and ran until February 12, 1988, after just two seasons. The series has received generally favorable reviews from critics.

Many of the episode titles are parodies of film and TV show titles.

Series overview

Episodes

Season 1 (1986–87)

Season 2 (1987–88)

References

External links 

 

Lists of American crime television series episodes
Lists of American sitcom episodes